Anjali Behera is an Indian politician. She was elected to the Odisha Legislative Assembly as a member of the Biju Janata Dal.

References

Living people
Biju Janata Dal politicians
Janata Dal politicians
Women in Odisha politics
1972 births
Odisha MLAs 2000–2004
Odisha MLAs 2004–2009
Odisha MLAs 2009–2014
21st-century Indian women politicians